La signorina Ciclone is a 1916 Italian film directed by Augusto Genina.

Cast
Francesco Cacace as Claudio Barsac 
Carlo Cattaneo   
Suzanne d'Armelle
Signora Romani   
Franz Sala   
Paolo Wullmann as  Aly

External links 
 

1916 films
Italian silent feature films
Films directed by Augusto Genina
Italian black-and-white films
Italian drama films
1916 drama films
Silent drama films